Opheliminae is a subfamily of the chalcid wasp family Eulophidae which consist of two genera and 56 species.

References

Eulophidae
Apocrita subfamilies